The Saint John Storm are a women's football team in the Maritime Women's Football League. Originally known as the Saint John Seagalls, they were also once known as the Saint John Buccaneers and are one of the three charter franchises in MWFL history. The current head coach is Larry Harlow and the coaching staff includes Jim Mather, Tyler Guimond, Danny Oliver and Gillian Gilmore. Games are contested at Kennebecasis High Field.

Year by year

IFAF competitors
The following recognizes women from the Saint John Storm that competed in the IFAF Women's World Football Championships

2010
Lori Boyles
Jaclyn Brewer
Ashley Clements
Melissa Daley
Erin Devlin
Kara Fillmore
Lisa Harlow
Kendra Jones
Lisa Rogers
 Amy Salter
Terri Shannon 
Trina Graves
 Alanna Waberski 
Michelle Young-Mather

2013
Lori Boyles
Trina Graves

Awards and honors
2011 SupHer Bowl VIII Most Outstanding Player Offense, Lisa Harlow
2011 SupHer Bowl VIII Most Outstanding Player Defense, Ashlee Clements
2010 SupHer Bowl VII Most Outstanding Player Offense, Kendra Jones
2010 SupHer Bowl VII Most Outstanding Player Defense, Jaclyn Brewer
2009 SupHer Bowl VI Most Outstanding Player Offense, Lori Boyles
2009 SupHer Bowl VI Most Outstanding Player Defense, Michele Young-Mather
2008 SupHer Bowl V Most Outstanding Player Defense, Alanna Waberski

References

Sport in Saint John, New Brunswick
Women's sports in Canada
Canadian football teams
Sports clubs established in 2004
2004 establishments in New Brunswick
Women in New Brunswick